Jerome Cardell White (born August 23, 1952) is an American former professional baseball outfielder and coach.

Listed at 5' 10", 164 lb., White was a switch hitter and threw right handed.

He was born in Shirley, Massachusetts.

White spent 11 seasons in Major League Baseball (MLB), including stints with the Montreal Expos, Chicago Cubs, and St. Louis Cardinals. Additionally, White played two seasons in Nippon Professional Baseball (NPB) with the Seibu Lions and Yokohama Taiyo Whales.

He later worked as the bench coach in the 1995 season then as the first base coach of the Minnesota Twins in a span of 14 seasons from 1998–2012.

Professional career

Player
White was selected by the Montreal Expos in the 14th round of the 1970 MLB Draft out of San Francisco's Washington High School. He made his major league debut on September 16, 1974 at Montreal's Jarry Park, in a 3–2 Expos' loss to the New York Mets.

His first full major league season came in 1976, as he hit .245 in 114 games with the Expos. On June 23, 1978, he was traded to the Chicago Cubs to complete an earlier deal made on June 9, 1978, in which the Expos acquired pitcher Woodie Fryman as the player to be named later.

White spent only 59 games in a Cubs' uniform. In late 1978, he was traded back to the Expos along with second baseman Rodney Scott in exchange for outfielder Sam Mejías.

In December 1985, White signed as a free agent with the St. Louis Cardinals. He made his final major league appearance on June 9, 1986, ironically against the Montreal Expos, the team he spent the majority of his professional career with. He retired with a career .253 batting average and 303 hits over an eleven-season major league career.

In 646 games over 11 seasons, White posted a .253 batting average (303-for-1196) with 155 runs, 21 home runs, 109 RBI, 57 stolen bases and 148 bases on balls. He finished his career with a .974 fielding percentage playing at all three outfield positions. In the 1981 postseason, he hit .235 (8-for-34) with 5 runs, 1 home run, 4 RBI, 4 stolen bases and 5 walks.

Winter Leagues
In between, White played winter ball with the Navegantes del Magallanes and Águilas del Zulia clubs of the Venezuelan League in the 1978–79 and 1983-84 seasons, respectively. A career highlight came in the 1979 Caribbean Series with the Venezuelan champion Magallanes, when White was the only player in the tournament with at least one hit in each game, leading the hitters with a .522 BA, 12 hits and a .607 OBP, including five runs, four RBI, a .783 SLG and 1.370 OPS.

Coaching
Following his playing career, White was hired as the first base coach of the Minnesota Twins in 1998. In October 2012, after two consecutive seasons of 90+ losses, the Twins' front office decided to shake things up by releasing or reassigning six of seven coaches, including White.

Honors
In February 2006, White was enshrined into the Caribbean Baseball Hall of Fame along with Dave Concepción (Venezuela), Pedro Formental (Cuba) and Celerino Sánchez (México), for their notable contributions to the Caribbean Series. During the ceremony, Chico Carrasquel and Emilio Cueche (both from Venezuela) also were honored.

Personal
White has two sons, Justin and Jerome, and a daughter, Noell.

Sources

External links
, or Baseball Almanac or Official Jerry White website

1952 births
Living people
African-American baseball coaches
African-American baseball players
Águilas del Zulia players
American expatriate baseball players in Canada
American expatriate baseball players in Japan
Baseball coaches from Massachusetts
Baseball players from Massachusetts
Chicago Cubs players
Denver Bears players
Detroit Tigers coaches
Fort Myers Sun Sox players
Gulf Coast Expos players
Major League Baseball first base coaches
Major League Baseball outfielders
Memphis Blues players
Minnesota Twins coaches
Montreal Expos players
Navegantes del Magallanes players
American expatriate baseball players in Venezuela
Nippon Professional Baseball outfielders
Peninsula Whips players
People from Shirley, Massachusetts
Québec Carnavals players
San Jose Bees players
Seibu Lions players
Sportspeople from Middlesex County, Massachusetts
St. Louis Cardinals players
West Palm Beach Expos players
West Palm Beach Tropics players
Wichita Aeros players
Yokohama Taiyō Whales players
21st-century African-American people
20th-century African-American sportspeople